Terry Ryan may refer to:

 Terry Ryan (ice hockey, born 1977), former NHL player
 Terry Ryan (ice hockey, born 1952), former WHA player
 Terry Ryan (writer) (1946–2007), American writer and author of the book The Prize Winner of Defiance, Ohio
 Terry Ryan (baseball) (born 1953), former Minnesota Twins General Manager
 Terry Ryan (tennis) (born 1942), South African tennis player in the 1960s and 70s
 Terry Ryan (screenwriter) (1922–2001), American television screenwriter
 Terry Ryan (racing driver) (born 1938), former NASCAR Cup Series driver
 Terry Ryan, author of Basic 7.0 used in the Commodore 128
 Terence Ryan (born 1948), British film director, writer and producer
 Terence Ryan (musician), American musician